The 1937 SANFL Grand Final was an Australian rules football competition.  beat  94 to 70.

References 

SANFL Grand Finals
SANFL Grand Final, 1937